Dennis Ohene Agyekum (born 1 July 1996 in Accra, Ghana) is a Ghanaian footballer who is attached to GD Resende in Portugal as of 2017.

Career

Dominican Republic

Scoring two goals in the 53rd and 65th minutes to help San Cristóbal beat Delfines del Este 4–1 in the 2016 Liga Dominicana de Fútbol, Agyekum was handed the Player of the Week Award for his performances that round.

International

Back in 2012, the Ghanaian midfielder suffered an injury which would be detrimental to his career as it caused him to get dropped from the Ghana Under-17s.

References

External links 

 Dennis Agyekum at playmakerstats.com (English version of ogol.com.br)

Ghanaian expatriate footballers
Footballers from Accra
Expatriate footballers in Portugal
Ghanaian footballers
Living people
Association football midfielders
Liga Dominicana de Fútbol players
Expatriate footballers in the Dominican Republic
1996 births
CA San Cristóbal players